Arnoldus Marius Hille (14 March 1829 – 7 January 1919) was a Norwegian Lutheran Bishop.

Biography
Hille was born at Leikanger in Nordre Bergenhus, Norway.  He was the son of Wollert Krohn Hille (1796-1860) and Elisabeth Marie Hess Lem (1798-1888). In 1841 he entered Bergen Cathedral School. In 1848, he begin to study theology.

In 1865, he became prison chaplain in Bergen and in 1872 he was appointed assistant pastor in Stange Church in Hedmark county. He served as bishop in the Diocese of Hamar from 1887 to 1906. He was decorated Knight of the Order of St. Olav in 1882 and Commander, First Class in 1895.

Personal life
He was married twice. In 1861, he married Charlotte Sofie Sandberg (1832-1875), daughter of Pastor Christian Juell Sandberg (1805-1843; see NBL1, Vol. 12) and Marie Catharine Rosenkilde (1802-1886). After her death, he married Georgine Børrea Sandberg (1840-1927), the younger sister of his first wife. His son Henrik Greve Hille (1881–1946) was Bishop of the Diocese of Hamar from 1934 to 1942 and his grandson Georg Hille was Bishop from 1975 to 1993.

References

1829 births
1919 deaths
People from Vik
Bishops of Hamar
19th-century Lutheran bishops
20th-century Norwegian Lutheran clergy
Recipients of the St. Olav's Medal
19th-century Norwegian Lutheran clergy